Peumo Airport,  is an airport  south of Peumo, a town in the O'Higgins Region of Chile.

The airport is within a bend of the Cachapoal River. There is nearby high terrain north through east of the runway.

See also

Transport in Chile
List of airports in Chile

References

External links
OpenStreetMap - Peumo
OurAirports - Peumo
FallingRain - Peumo Airport

Airports in Chile
Airports in O'Higgins Region